The women's 4 × 200 metres relay at the 2017 IAAF World Relays was held at the Thomas Robinson Stadium on 22–23 April.

The heats were held only to eliminate one team to make a field of eight.  That team turned out to be Kenya, whose national record still fell almost 6 seconds behind as a time qualifier.

After being beaten by Nigeria two years earlier, Jamaica took this race seriously.  Out of the blocks Jura Levy opened up a gap on the US to her inside and gained on Trinidad and Tobago's Kamaria Durant to her outside.  Passing to Shericka Jackson well into the second turn of the four turn stagger race, Jamaica had already made up the offset on both teams to their outside.  Jackson slightly pulled away from the last visible competitor, China's Liang Xiaojing already down a full lap's stagger two lanes away.  Jackson passed to Sashalee Forbes almost alone.  More than 10 metres behind, Germany's Tatjana Pinto passed to Rebekka Haase  and USA's Tiffany Townsend passed to Felicia Brown about even.  Through the next leg Forbes was all alone while Hasse caught and edge ahead of Townsend to her outside before Townsend caught back up.  Out front, Forbes passed to Elaine Thompson before any other team's anchor runner even had started to move.  With almost a 15-metre lead, and the double Olympic Champion on anchor, victory was assured.  Townsend regained her stagger advantage and a little more going into the USA handoff to Shalonda Solomon but Germany's Gina Lückenkemper quickly gained through the turn opening up a 2-metre lead.  Thompson merely extended lead for an easy Jamaican win.  Behind her, Solomon accelerated but was only able to close down less than a metre, Lückenkemper getting silver for Germany.

Records
Prior to the competition, the records were as follows:

Schedule

Results

Heats
Qualification: First 2 of each heat (Q) plus the 2 fastest times (q) advanced to the final.

Final
The final was started at 23:32.

References

4 x 200 metres relay
4 × 200 metres relay
2017 in women's athletics